The 2021 Big East Conference women's soccer tournament was the postseason women's soccer tournament for the Big East Conference held from October 31 through November 7, 2021. The five-match tournament took place at Xavier University's Corcoran Field in Cincinnati, Ohio for the Semifinals and Finals, while the Quarterfinals were hosted by the higher seeded team. The six-team single-elimination tournament consisted of three rounds based on seeding from regular season conference play. The defending champions were the Georgetown Hoyas. They successfully defended their title by defeating St. John's in the final 1-0.  This is the fifth title in program history for Georgetown and head coach Dave Nolan.  All five of their titles have come in the last six years. As tournament champions, Georgetown earned the Big East's automatic berth into the 2021 NCAA Division I Women's Soccer Tournament.

Seeding 
The top six teams in the regular season earned a spot in the tournament.  No tiebreakers were required as each of the top six teams finished with unique point totals.  The Semifinals and Finals of the tournament were hosted by the first seed, Xavier.

Bracket

Source:

Schedule

Quarterfinals

Semifinals

Final

Statistics

Goalscorers

All-Tournament team

Source:

* Offensive MVP
^ Defensive MVP

References 

 
Big East Conference Women's Soccer Tournament